The Mao Kun map is a set of navigation charts published in the Ming dynasty military treatise Wubei Zhi. It depicts the geography of eastern China, southeast and southern Asia, Arabia, and eastern Africa. Along the way, it includes Chinese labels of 570 islands, towns, and other places.

Some locations in China are easily identified, as their names have not changed over the centuries. Farther west, the identity of locations marked on the map become more difficult to determine. This list includes the most likely candidates for each map label.

Yangtze River

China Coast

South China Sea

Strait of Malacca

Bay of Bengal

Eastern Indian Ocean

References

Historic maps of the world
Historic maps of Asia
Maps of China
Treasure voyages
17th-century maps and globes
Lists of places